The Veil is a 2017 American post-apocalyptic film directed by Brent Ryan Green and starring William Levy, Serinda Swan, William Moseley and Nick E. Tarabay. The film is also known as Rise of a Warrior and Barbarian: Rise of the Warrior.

Premise
The Veil is set in a war-torn land where tribal factions live in fear of annihilation, and tells the story of a deadly warrior leading a destructive war campaign. When he is betrayed by his own and left for dead, he is healed by a mysterious princess and taken in by a hidden tribe that believes he was chosen to wage a final battle.

Cast
 William Levy as Warrior.
 Serinda Swan as Zera.
 William Moseley as Aysel.
 Nick E. Tarabay as Reiken.
 Brett DelBuono as Nikai
 Adam Gregory as Warrior's Father
 Christopher Levy as Young Warrior
 Brent Ryan Green as Young Evil Emperor
 Owen Joyner as Mountain Tribe Boy

Release 
The Veil released in Brazil on April 15, 2017. It also released in the United Kingdom, where it was titled Barbarian: Rise of the Warrior.

Reception 
Starburst reviewed the film, noting it was "Not a perfect film, but definitely enjoyable for those already a fan of this genre."

References

External links
 
 

2010s science fiction films
2017 films
American post-apocalyptic films
Films shot in Oklahoma
American science fiction action films
Films produced by Brent Ryan Green
Films directed by Brent Ryan Green
2010s English-language films
2010s American films